3-Hydroxypropionyl-CoA synthase (3-hydroxypropionyl-CoA synthetase (AMP-forming), 3-hydroxypropionate-CoA ligase) is an enzyme with systematic name hydroxypropionate:CoA ligase (AMP-forming). This enzyme catalyses the following chemical reaction

 3-hydroxypropionate + ATP + CoA  3-hydroxypropionyl-CoA + AMP + diphosphate

This enzyme catalyses a step in the 3-hydroxypropionate/4-hydroxybutyrate cycle.

References

External links 
 

EC 6.2.1